Ottilie Adelina Liljencrantz (January 19, 1876 – October 7, 1910) was an American writer of Norse-themed historical novels.

Early life
Ottilie Adelina Liljencrantz was born in Chicago, Illinois, the daughter of Gustave Adolph Mathias Liljencrantz, a civil engineer, and Adelina Charlotte Hall Liljencrantz. Her father was born in Sweden. "I wish that I could trace my descent to some renowned Viking," she confided in an interview, "and I will not relinquish the pleasant belief that I have some valiant ancestor on Valhalla's benches," but history only confirmed her as a descendant of sixteenth-century Swedish clergyman Laurentius Petri. Among her teachers was drama teacher Anna Morgan, who remembered Liljencrantz as "an attractive young woman with a mind unusually endowed. She had a vivid fancy and a true sense of proportion, she seemed to have been set apart for a career in literature".

Career
When she was still a teenager, she wrote plays and produced them with the help of children in her neighborhood. One such drama, "In Fairyland" (1895), involved over 100 children when it was mounted as a benefit for the Home for Destitute Crippled Children.

Books by Liljencrantz included The Scrape that Jack Built (1897, a children's book), The Thrall of Leif the Lucky: A Story of Viking Days (1902, a novel about Leif Erikson), The Ward of King Canute (1903), The Vinland Champions (1904), Randvar the Songsmith: A Romance of Norumbega (1906, a novel with a werewolf theme), and A Viking's Love and Other Tales of the North (1911, a collection of short stories published posthumously). Troy Kinney and Margaret West Kinney illustrated three of Liljencrantz's books. Her novel The Thrall of Leif the Lucky was adapted for a silent film, The Viking (1928).

Personal life
Liljencrantz died after a surgery to treat cancer in 1910, aged 34 years, in Chicago.

References

External links
 
 Jim Craig, "She Made the Vikings Come Alive" Under Every Tombstone (January 16, 2015). A blog post about Ottilie A. Liljencrantz, illustrated with newspaper clippings and book covers.
 Ottilie A. Liljencrantz's IMDB page.

1876 births
1910 deaths
American women writers
Writers from Chicago
American historical novelists
Writers of historical fiction set in the Middle Ages